Synaptotagmin-3 is a protein that in humans is encoded by the SYT3 gene.

References

Further reading